The 1978–79 Iraq FA Cup was the third edition of the Iraq FA Cup as a clubs-only competition. The tournament was won by Al-Zawraa, beating Al-Jaish 3–1 in the final on 3 May 1979 to secure their second cup, with goals from Hazem Jassam, Ibrahim Ali and Thamir Yousef. Al-Zawraa's previous  matches in the tournament were a 7–0 win over Al-Hurriya, a 3–1 win over Al-Ittihad, a 4–0 win over Al-Shorta and a 6–0 win over Al-Shabab, while Al-Jaish had eliminated Al-Tayaran from the semi-finals who in turn had beaten Al-Minaa in the quarter-finals. Al-Zawraa also won the 1978–79 Iraqi National League to complete the second double in Iraqi football.

Matches

Final

References

External links
 Iraqi Football Website

Iraq FA Cup
Cup